Big Brother 2018, also known as Big Brother 19 was the nineteenth series of Big Brother, and the final series to air on Channel 5. The series launched four days after the final of Celebrity Big Brother 22 on 14 September 2018 and lasted for 53 days with the final ever episode airing on 5 November 2018. The series is the eighth regular and twenty-third series of Big Brother to air on Channel 5 since 2011; it was also the final series of Big Brother in the three-year contract that was announced on 19 March 2015, which guaranteed that the show would air on Channel 5 until 2018.

On 14 September 2018, it was confirmed that this series would be the final series to air on Channel 5.

On 5 November 2018, Cameron Cole was announced as the winner of the series, beating Akeem Griffiths who finished as runner-up.  At 19 years old, Cole is the youngest winner of Big Brother in the UK series' eighteen-year history. Much like Ultimate Big Brother, the final Channel 4 series, the series ended with the words "Big Brother will get back to you".

Production

Creative team
Endemol confirmed that a new creative team had been formed ahead of the series. Paul Osborne, executive producer of Big Brother 7, returns to overlook the new series as Creative Director. Trevor Boris was also later hired as a senior producer after co-producing Big Brother Canada since its inception.

Format
On several occasions in the run-up to Celebrity Big Brother 22, various news reports and Big Brother alumni hinted at the series going back to its roots, with less producer manipulation and a focus on the show as a social experiment.

The shows' producers also met with several fansites to discuss the direction of the show, with it being heavily reported that the show will bring back weekly shopping tasks and a consistent nominations format.

Eye logo
It was confirmed by creative director Paul Osborne that the series would have a "separate identity" from the Celebrity Big Brother 22.

The eye was revealed on 4 September 2018, with Osborne commenting on its look of "a vast luminous orb of colours".

Cancellation
On 24 August 2018 while speaking at the Edinburgh International Television Festival Channel 5 controller Ben Frow announced that he was planning for a year without the Big Brother franchise on Channel 5 in 2019, confirming that the current three-year contract expires at Christmas 2018. Frow had previously stated at the 2017 event that he'd be much happier with a channel without Big Brother on it. On 14 September 2018, Channel 5 confirmed that both Big Brother and Celebrity Big Brother had been axed and that this series would be "the end of the game”.

Housemates
In an interview with fansite "BBSpy", creative director Paul Osborne stated that the team were actively trying to find "totally unknown" housemates for the series. In the past, some housemates had previously appeared on reality shows such as The Valleys, Ibiza Weekender and Ex on the Beach.

On 10 September 2018, during the final of Celebrity Big Brother 22, a trailer was released showing close-ups of each of the fourteen housemates with their occupation, age and home town, and the public were granted the power to give one of them an early advantage in the series by voting in a poll.

Big Coins
For this series, Big Coins were introduced to the housemates as house currency. Throughout the series, housemates were able to earn, steal and collect Big Coins in a number of tasks, which would ultimately give them power and the right to buy privileges.

Week 1
 Ahead of the launch, the viewers were able to give one housemate an early advantage in the game by voting in a public vote for their favourite housemate based on just their occupation, age and home town. They chose "The Waitress" Sîan, who began the game with 100 Big Coins. On launch night, the housemates were told that they'd be competing against each other to collect Big Coins with the three poorest housemates ultimately facing the first eviction. Zoe, the occupant of Bed 13, was also given the secret power of swapping coin totals with another housemate of her choice, and chose Lewis G. At the end of the week, Anamélia, Kay and Sîan faced eviction. Following Anamélia's eviction, she decided to donate her coins to Tomasz.

Week 2
 The second week featured housemates taking part in an auction, where they could bid for luxuries with their coins. With Akeem being the richest housemate at the time of nominations, he was able to take part in the Gamechanger task alongside the nominees and two housemates of his choice. As punishment for discussing nominations, Lewis F was deducted 100 Big Coins. Tomasz was also given the opportunity to secretly earn himself more coins by putting the luxury shopping task at risk. Following Lewis G's eviction, he decided to donate his coins to Isaac.

Week 3
 The third week featured housemates going into the task room one by one where each housemate's stack of coins were shown. Each housemate had 90-seconds to decide where to distribute the coins by taking some from coins from a housemate's stack and placing them somewhere else. Another auction then took place  where housemates could spend their coins. With Cian the richest housemate at the time, he was able to play the Gamechanger alongside the nominees. Following Isaac's eviction, he decided to donate his coins to Tomasz.

Week 4
 The fourth week featured another auction where immunity from the next set of nominations was on offer. As punishment for discussing nominations, Lewis F was deducted 100 coins from his total. The housemates were told that they could give a 250 Big Coin advantage to one of the new housemates; Hussain or Isabella, who were currently bankrupt. They chose Isabella. However, Isabella was then asked which housemate she'd like to take the coins from, choosing Tomasz, the richest housemate at the time. With Cian being the richest housemate at the time of nominations, he was able to play the Gamechanger alongside the nominees. Following Kenaley's eviction, she decided to donate her coins to Hussain.

Weekly summary
The main events in the Big Brother 19 house are summarised in the table below. A typical week begins with nominations, followed by the shopping task, and then the eviction of a Housemate during the live Friday episode. Evictions, tasks, and other events for a particular week are noted in order of sequence.

Nominations table

Notes

 : In the first week, there were no nominations. Instead, housemates were tasked with collecting "Big Coins". The three housemates with the fewest faced the public vote.
 :  This housemate was nominated by the public, as they received the fewest votes in an app poll.
 : Week 2 introduced the Gamechanger. Each week, six Housemates will participate in the Gamechanger Competition for the Gamechanger Power - the ability to save a nominee from eviction. The nominees and the richest housemate would be guaranteed to play, with the remaining slots being allocated by the richest housemate to the housemates of his/her choice.
 : As new housemates, Hussain and Isabella were exempt from the nomination process. Tomasz bought immunity at the weekly auction but could still nominate.
 : Hussain won the "Absolute Power Nomination" in a secret auction, and was, therefore, able to anonymously choose a housemate to face eviction. He nominated Lewis F, who was also ineligible to play in the Gamechanger and could not be saved by the gamechanger.
 : This week there were two evictions. Following the regular eviction on Day 36, the remaining Housemates played a week's worth of Big Brother — including Nominations, the Gamechanger competition and ceremony during the remainder of the live eviction show, culminating in a second eviction for the night. Cameron, as the richest housemate, had immunity for this second eviction, as well as the power to evict either of the Final nominees (Akeem or Isabella) from the house.
 : This week was positive nominations. As such, housemates were nominating who they wanted to stay rather than leave. The housemates with the fewest nominations would be nominated.
 : Week 6 was the final week in which the Gamechanger Power was in play. Additionally, the Final Gamechanger had the power to save two nominees, as opposed to one.
 : There were no nominations in Week 7. Instead, the phone lines opened for the public to vote for the winner. The phone lines froze on Day 50, and the two housemates with the fewest votes were evicted.

Ratings
Official ratings are taken from BARB.

References

External links
 
 

2018 British television seasons
19
Channel 5 (British TV channel) reality television shows